The Stúdentspróf is an educational diploma in Iceland, which allows them to matriculate at university and take up their studies. Studies leading to the Stúdentspróf generally take three years to complete, and most students finish their Stúdentspróf in their 19th year of age, after 13 years of formal schooling. The grading scale ranges in steps of 0.5 from 0 to 10, 10 being the highest.

The curricula for the diploma are regulated by the Ministry of Education; any secondary school can offer the Stúdentspróf as long as it conforms to the ministry's regulations.

See also

 Education in Iceland
 Matriculation examination

Education in Iceland
Secondary school qualifications